Adi Sasono (February 16, 1943 – August 13, 2016) was an Indonesian politician. He served as the Minister of Cooperatives, Small and Medium Businesses from 1998 to 1999 within the Development Reform Cabinet of President B. J. Habibie.

Adi Sasono was born on February 16, 1943, in  Pekalongan, Central Java, in present-day Indonesia. He died at Mayapada Hospital in Lebak Bulus, South Jakarta, at 5:20 p.m. on August 13, 2016, at the age of 73. His death was confirmed by the Ministry of Cooperative and Micro, Small and Medium Enterprises.

References

1943 births
2016 deaths
Government ministers of Indonesia